Broadview was a federal electoral district in Ontario, Canada, that was represented in the House of Commons of Canada from 1935 to 1979. This riding was created in 1933 from parts of Toronto East and Toronto—Scarborough ridings.

It initially consisted of the part of the city of Toronto bounded by a line drawn north from Lake Ontario along Leslie Avenue, west along Eastern Avenue, north along Rushbrook Avenue, west along Queen Street, north along Jones Avenue, west along Danforth Avenue, north along Langford Avenue, thence west along the city limits, and south and west along the Don River to Toronto Bay.

In 1966, it was redefined to consist of the part of Metropolitan Toronto bounded by a line drawn north from Lake Ontario along Leslie Street, east along Queen Street East, north along Greenwood Avenue, west along Sammon Avenue, south along Pape Avenue, west along Fulton Avenue to Broadview Avenue, south along the Don River, west along Lake Shore Boulevard East, and south along Cherry Street to Lake Ontario.

Its provincial counterpart in elections to the Ontario Legislative Assembly was the riding of Riverdale which covered much of the same area.

Broadview was abolished in 1976 when it was redistributed between Beaches, Broadview—Greenwood and Rosedale ridings.

Members of Parliament

This riding has elected the following Members of Parliament:

Election results

1935 Boundaries

|}

|}

|}

On Mr. Church's death, 7 February 1950:

|}

|}

1966 Boundaries

On Mr. Gilbert's resignation, 28 April 1978:

|}

See also

 List of Canadian federal electoral districts
 Past Canadian electoral districts

External links
Riding history from the Library of Parliament

Former federal electoral districts of Ontario
Federal electoral districts of Toronto